Artur Kuciapski (born December 26, 1993) is a Polish middle distance runner, who specializes in the 800 metres.

Biography
On 15 August 2014, he won the silver medal at the 2014 European Championship with a new personal best of 1:44.89.

In 2017, he won the bronze medal in the men's 4 × 800 metres relay at the 2017 IAAF World Relays held in Nassau, Bahamas.

Competition record

Personal bests
Outdoor
400 metres – 47.09 (Biała Podlaska 2014)
800 metres – 1:44.89 (Zürich 2014)
1500 metres – 4:18.47 (Łódź 2009)

Indoor
400 metres – 48.87 (Spała 2014)
600 metres – 1:16.77 (Athlone 2017)
800 metres – 1:48.14 (Toruń 2017)
1000 metres – 2:23.96 (Spała 2014)

References

External links
 

1993 births
Living people
Polish male middle-distance runners
European Athletics Championships medalists
World Athletics Championships athletes for Poland
Place of birth missing (living people)
21st-century Polish people